The 2015 season is the 120th year in the club's history, the 104th season in Clube de Regatas do Flamengo's football existence, and their 45th in the Brazilian Série A, having never been relegated from the top division.

This season Flamengo did not participate in continental competition, failing to qualify for either the Copa Libertadores or Copa Sudamericana based on the previous season's performance.

Kits

Club

First-team squad

Transfers

In

Out

Loans in

Loans out

Friendlies

Super Series
Prior to the beginning of the Campeonato Carioca, Flamengo participated in a friendly tournament against São Paulo and Vasco da Gama in the Arena da Amazônia.

Other friendlies
Aside from the Super Series, Flamengo participated in a number of other friendlies, including a match against Ukrainian club Shahktar Donetsk in Brasília and a send-off match against Nacional for Léo Moura after ten years with Flamengo. The club also played against Icasa just before the start of the Brasileirão season, and two other matches during pauses in the Brasileirão season for 2018 World Cup qualifying matches. 

In commemoration of Flamengo's 120th anniversary, they played a friendly in the Maracanã against MLS club Orlando City on 15 November.

Overall

Competitions

Campeonato Carioca

Like the previous edition, the 2015 Campeonato Carioco was organized as a single table, called the Taça Guanabara, with the top four teams qualifying for the semifinals.

Taça Guanabara

Matches

Semifinals

Copa do Brasil

Flamengo entered the Copa do Brasil in the First Round via claiming the championship in the 2014 Campeonato Carioca. The draw was held on 16 December 2014. A second draw by CBF for the Round of 16 and onward was held on 4 August.

First round

Second round 

Flamengo won by at least 2 goals in the stadium of the opposing team, qualifying directly to the next round without the need to play a second leg.

Third round

Round of 16

Série A

League table

Matches

Statistics

Appearances and goals

References

External links
 Clube de Regatas do Flamengo
 Flamengo official website (in Portuguese)

Brazilian football clubs 2015 season
CR Flamengo seasons